In mathematics, the Grothendieck–Teichmüller group GT is a group closely related to (and possibly equal to) the absolute Galois group of the rational numbers. There are several minor variations of the group: a discrete version, a pro-l version, a k-pro-unipotent version, and a profinite version; the first three versions were defined by Drinfeld, and the version most often used is the profinite version.

References

 Translation in Leningrad Math. J. 2 (1991), no. 4, 829–860 .

Number theory